Acacia wetarensis is a shrub belonging to the genus Acacia and the subgenus Juliflorae that is native to South East Asia on Auturo Island in Timor-Leste and the Lesser Sunda Islands of Indonesia.

See also
List of Acacia species

References

wetarensis
Flora of the Lesser Sunda Islands
Taxa named by Leslie Pedley
Plants described in 1975